Loretteville is a former city in central Quebec, Canada. It was amalgamated into Quebec City on January 1, 2002. It is located within the borough of La Haute-Saint-Charles, and also contains the upmarket neighbourhood of Montchâtel. Its population in 2001 was 13,737 residents.

Loretteville is the birthplace of pop singer Mitsou and Rockford Ice Hogs goalie Jean-François Rivard and poet/musician Geneviève Castrée.

External links 
 
 

Former municipalities in Quebec
Neighbourhoods in Quebec City
Populated places disestablished in 2002